The Development Finance Company of Uganda Group, commonly referred to as the DFCU Group, is a financial services company in Uganda.

Overview

 DFCU Limited
 DFCU Bank Limited
 DFCU Leasing Limited
 Rwenzori Properties Limited
 Nakasero Properties Limited

DFCU Limited is the holding company and it is listed on the Uganda Securities Exchange (USE), under the symbol DFCU.

DFCU Stock
, DFCU stock is owned by the following corporate entities and individuals:

DFCU House
DFCU Group is in the process of building its new headquarters, which will also house the main branch of DFCU Bank. The building will be known as DFCU House and will rise an estimated ten stories high. Located at 26 Kyaddondo Road, on Nakasero Hill, in Kampala's central business district, the development will have underground and surface parking, as well as rentable, retail and office space on several levels.

See also
 DFCU Bank
 Banking in Uganda
 List of tallest buildings in Kampala

References

External links
 DFCU Group
 Uganda Securities Exchange
 Bank of Uganda
 Google finance, Profile of DFCU Group
 About DFCU Group
 DFCU Stock Quote

 
Companies listed on the Uganda Securities Exchange
Companies based in Kampala